Anju is an Indian actress best known for her work in Malayalams and Tamil films. She hails from Tamil Nadu and is now acting in tele films and soap operas. She debuted at the age of two with the Tamil movie Uthiripookkal in 1979. She had acted in a Kannada and Telugu movies as well. She won the Kerala State Film Award for Best Actress in 1988 for the movie Rukmini.

Awards
 1988 Kerala State Film Award for Best Actress - Rukmini

Filmography

Malayalam

Tamil

Telugu

Kannada

Television

Other TV Shows
2020: Vanakkam Tamizha - Tamil 
2022: Red Carpet - Malayalam

References

External links

Anju at MSI

Kerala State Film Award winners
Actresses in Malayalam cinema
20th-century Indian actresses
21st-century Indian actresses
Actresses in Tamil cinema
Actresses in Telugu cinema
Actresses from Tamil Nadu
Actresses in Kannada cinema
Indian film actresses
Indian child actresses
Living people
Actresses in Malayalam television
Indian television actresses
Actresses in Tamil television
Child actresses in Malayalam cinema
Year of birth missing (living people)